Terraforming is well represented in contemporary literature, usually in the form of science fiction, as well as in popular culture.  While many stories involving interstellar travel feature planets already suited to habitation by humans and supporting their own indigenous life, some authors prefer to address the unlikeliness of such a concept by instead detailing the means by which humans have converted inhospitable worlds to ones capable of supporting life through artificial means.

History of use 
Author Jack Williamson is credited with inventing and popularizing the term "terraform".  In July 1942, under the pseudonym Will Stewart, Williamson published a science fiction novella entitled "Collision Orbit" in Astounding Science-Fiction magazine.  The series was later published as two novels, Seetee Shock (1949) and Seetee Ship (1951).  American geographer Richard Cathcart successfully lobbied for formal recognition of the verb "to terraform", and it was first included in the fourth edition of the Shorter Oxford English Dictionary in 1993.

In fact, perhaps predating the concept of terraforming, is that of xenoforming – a process in which aliens change the Earth to suit their own needs, already suggested in the classic The War of the Worlds (1898) of H.G. Wells.

Literature

Terraforming of fictional planets in literature
H. G. Wells alludes to what today might be called xeno-terraforming - alien life altering Earth for their own benefit - in his 1898 novel The War of the Worlds.  When the Martians arrive they bring with them a red weed that spreads and (temporarily) overpowers terrestrial vegetation.
Terraforming is one of the basic concepts around which Frank Herbert's Dune novels (1965-1985) are based: the Fremen's obsession with converting the desert-world Arrakis to earthlike conditions supplies the fugitive Paul Atreides with a ready-made army of followers (In later books, the focus shifts to those trying to "arrakisform" earthlike planets to support the giant sandworms and produce their desired 'spice' secretion). The Imperium's capital world Kaitain has all its weather controlled by satellites. Pardot Kynes, the Planetary Ecologist from Arrakis visited the world, and commented that the nature of the control meant it would eventually bring about disaster, which is why Arrakis should be terraformed through more natural processes.
Roger MacBride Allen's novel The Depths of Time (2000) features a fictional planet, Solace, on which terraforming is failing and bringing about climatic and ecological collapse.
Liz Williams' novel The Ghost Sister (2001) offers a critique of terraforming. The ruling elite of Irie St Syre, the Gaianism priestesses, believe that humanity has a right to adapt the climate and biosphere of planets to its own needs.  They send out emissaries to a lost colony, Monde d'Isle, who have adapted humanity to their planet, not the other way around.
Laura J. Mixon's novel Burning the Ice (2002) is set on an imagined frozen moon of 47 Ursae Majoris b which is being terraformed by induced global warming.
Building Harlequin's Moon (2005), by Larry Niven and Brenda Cooper, shows the creation of a substantial moon by smashing several smaller moons together, and the very lengthy process of terraforming it over 60,000 years.
Chris Moriarty's novel Spin Control (2006) features a fictional planet, Novalis, on which terraforming is progressing in a speed and direction which defy scientific theory.
In These Broken Stars by Amie Kaufman, the protagonist, teenage Lilac LaRoux, lives a life of luxury due to her rich father who has financed the terraforming of several planets (such as Corinth) inside the fictional universe. The story focusses on Lilac and an army commander as they are the only survivors of a spaceship crash on a planet that appears to be in the process of terraforming but has been abandoned.
The Star Wars Legends continuity expanded universe contains the Yuuzhan Vong, whom invade the galaxy, Vongforming or worldshaping conquered worlds like Coruscant to fit their  needs. Following the Vong's defeat, many Vongformed worlds were still a disaster, even after reterraforming attempts due to sabotage.
 In Children of Time (2015),  Adrian Tchaikovsky describes a human expedition to a distant, terraformed exoplanet.

Television and film

Video games

Deformable terrain, as used in e.g. Perimeter and Red Faction, is occasionally called terraforming but is not a form of planetary engineering.

As a game mechanic

As a plot element

Notes

References

Planetary engineering
Fiction about outer space
Science in popular culture
Popular culture